Cheritrella truncipennis, the truncate imperial, is a small butterfly found in India (Sikkim - Assam), Burma and West China (Yunnan) that belongs to the lycaenids or blues family. Its genus, Cheritrella, was erected by Lionel de Nicéville and is monotypic.

References

External links
Cheritrella at Markku Savela's Lepidoptera and Some Other Life Forms

Cheritrini
Taxa named by Lionel de Nicéville
Lycaenidae genera
Monotypic butterfly genera